Mario Medina (born 16 October 1958) is a Venezuelan former cyclist. He competed in the individual road race and team time trial events at the 1980 Summer Olympics.

References

External links
 

1958 births
Living people
Venezuelan male cyclists
Olympic cyclists of Venezuela
Cyclists at the 1980 Summer Olympics
Place of birth missing (living people)
Pan American Games medalists in cycling
20th-century Venezuelan people
21st-century Venezuelan people
Pan American Games bronze medalists for Venezuela
Medalists at the 1983 Pan American Games